Anișoara Cușmir-Stanciu (born 28 June 1962) is a retired Romanian long jumper. She won a gold medal at the 1984 Olympics, and placed second at the 1982 European and 1983 world championships. Between 1982 and 1983 she improved the world record four times. She retired after the 1984 Olympics to become an athletics coach at CSA Steaua București. She was elected as President of Romanian Athletics Federation in May 2021.

References

External links 
 
 
 
 

1962 births
Living people
Sportspeople from Brăila
Romanian female long jumpers
Olympic gold medalists for Romania
Athletes (track and field) at the 1984 Summer Olympics
Olympic athletes of Romania
World record setters in athletics (track and field)
World Athletics Championships medalists
European Athletics Championships medalists
Medalists at the 1984 Summer Olympics
Olympic gold medalists in athletics (track and field)
Universiade medalists in athletics (track and field)
Universiade silver medalists for Romania
Medalists at the 1983 Summer Universiade
Presidents of the Romanian Athletics Federation